Manassiddare Marga is a 1967 Indian Kannada-language film, directed by M. R. Vittal and produced by Srikanth Nahatha and Srikanth Patel. The film stars Rajkumar, Rajashankar, Narasimharaju and K. S. Ashwath. The film has musical score by M. Ranga Rao. The film was a remake of 1957 Hindi movie Bada Bhai which had also been remade earlier in Telugu in 1959 as Sabhash Ramudu.

Cast

Soundtrack
The music was composed by M. Ranga Rao.

References

External links
 
Manassiddare Marga /ಮನಸ್ಸಿದ್ದರೆ ಮಾರ್ಗ - explanation

1967 films
1960s Kannada-language films
Films scored by M. Ranga Rao
Kannada remakes of Hindi films
Films directed by M. R. Vittal
1967 drama films